The 2003 Chatham Cup was the 76th annual nationwide knockout football competition in New Zealand.

Up to the last 16 of the competition, the cup was run in three regions (northern, central, and southern), with an open draw from the quarter-finals on. In all, 131 teams took part in the competition. The competition consisted of a preliminary round and five rounds proper before quarter-finals, semi-finals, and a final. Golden goal extra time was played in ties which finished level at full time.

The 2003 final
Derek Rugg became the first referee since G. Jackson in the 1920s and 1930s to control three Chatham Cup finals, having previously refereed the 2000 and 2002 finals. In the final University-Mount Wellington subdued Melville United, running out 3-1 winners.

The Jack Batty Memorial Cup is awarded to the player adjudged to have made to most positive impact in the Chatham Cup final. The winner of the 2003 Jack Batty Memorial Cup was Kara Waetford of University-Mount Wellington.

Results

Third round

* Won on penalties by North Shore (8-7) and Wellington College (4-3)

Fourth round

Fifth round

Quarter-finals

Semi-finals

Final

References

Rec.Sport.Soccer Statistics Foundation New Zealand 2003 page
UltimateNZSoccer website 2003 Chatham Cup page

Chatham Cup
Chatham Cup
Chatham Cup
Chat